Niles may refer to:

Places

Places in the United States
 Niles, Fremont, California, a community that is now part of Fremont
 Niles, Illinois, a village
 Niles, Kansas, an unincorporated community
 Niles, Michigan, a city
 Niles, North Dakota, an unincorporated community
 Niles, New York, a town
 Niles, Ohio, a city
 Niles Canyon, California
 Niles Township (disambiguation)

People and fictional characters
 Niles (name), a list of people and fictional characters

Other uses
 Niles Community High School, Troy, Michigan
 Niles Car and Manufacturing Company, an American manufacturer of railroad equipment (1901–1917)

See also
Nile (disambiguation)
Justice Niles (disambiguation)